In Greek mythology, the suitors of Penelope (also known as the Proci) are one of the main subjects of Homer's Odyssey.

Role in the Odyssey

In the Odyssey Homer describes Odysseus' journey home from Troy. Prior to the Trojan War, Odysseus was King of Ithaca, a Greek island known for its isolation and rugged terrain. When he departs from Ithaca to fight for the Greeks in the war, he leaves behind a newborn child, Telemachus, and his wife, Penelope. Although most surviving Greek soldiers return shortly after the end of the fighting, Odysseus does not return to Ithaca until ten years after the end of the Trojan War.

During Odysseus' long absence, unmarried young men start to suspect that Odysseus died in Troy or on the journey home. Under the pretense of courting Penelope, these youths, called "the suitors", take up residence in Odysseus' home and vie for her hand in marriage. Rather than simply rejecting the suitors, Penelope devises a plan to delay their courtship. She claims she will choose a husband after she has finished weaving a funeral shroud to present to Odysseus' father, Laertes. For three years, Penelope weaves the shroud during the day and unravels it at night, awaiting her husband's return. The suitors learn of Penelope's delaying tactic when one of her maidservants, Melantho, reveals it to her lover Eurymachus. Upon finding out, the suitors demand that she choose a husband from among them.

The suitors behave badly in Odysseus' home, drinking his wine and eating his food. Odysseus' son, Telemachus, now a young man, is frustrated with the suitors. Telemachus laments to Athena (disguised as Mentes, one of Odysseus' guest-friends) about the suitors' behavior. In return, Athena urges Telemachus to stand up to the suitors and set out in search of his father.

Once Odysseus returns home (after Athena initially disguises him as a beggar so he can plot his revenge in secret), his son Telemachus tells him that there are 108 suitors: 52 from Dulichium, 24 from Same, 20 Achaeans from Zacynthus, and 12 from Ithaca. Together, Odysseus, Telemachus, Eumaeus and Philoetius kill the suitors and the disloyal maidservants.  For reasons of oral presentation (i.e., a memory aid), the suitors are usually listed in the same order throughout the Odyssey.

Important suitors 
Although there are many suitors, three are particularly important to the narrative of the epic.

Antinous 
Antinous, son of Eupheithes, is the first of the suitors to speak in the epic and the first to die upon Odysseus' return. Antinous is the most disrespectful of the suitors and is the one who devises a plan to murder Telemachus upon his return to Ithaca. Although his plan is vetoed by Amphinomus, Antinous continues to behave arrogantly. When Odysseus finally returns home, disguised as a beggar, Antinous does not show him hospitality and throws a stool at him.

Eurymachus 
Eurymachus, son of Polybus, is the second of the suitors to appear in the epic. Eurymachus acts as a leader among the suitors because of his charisma. He is noted to be the most likely to win Penelope's hand because her father and brothers support the union and because he outdoes the other suitors in gift-giving. Although he is charismatic, Eurymachus is deceitful. He discovers Penelope's plot because he is having an affair with one of Penelope's maidservants, Melantho. Eurymachus also throws a stool at Odysseus. Further, when Odysseus reveals himself to the suitors, Eurymachus attempts to avoid punishment for the suitors' misdeeds by blaming them all on Antinous.

Amphinomus 
Amphinomus, son of King Nisos, is the most sympathetic of the suitors. Amphinomus attempts twice to dissuade the suitors from murdering Telemachus. Odysseus recognizes this and attempts to warn Amphinomus to leave the home before the final battle. Despite this, Amphinomus stays and dies along with the other suitors.

List of suitors

Appearing in the Odyssey

While most of the suitors are not dealt with individually by Homer, some are mentioned by name and play more or less significant roles in the poem. Among them are:

 Agelaus, son of Damastor. Killed by Odysseus.
 Amphimedon, son of Melaneus. Killed by Telemachus. Later recounts his death to Agamemnon and Achilles while in the underworld and blames Penelope for it.
 Amphinomus. Shows courtesy towards the disguised Odysseus, who warns him against staying; the warning goes unheeded, though, and he is killed along with the other suitors, though by Telemachus and not Odysseus.
 Antinous, son of Eupeithes. One of the leaders of the suitors and the first to be killed by Odysseus, he helps instigate the plot to kill Telemachus as he returns from the mainland, and helps spur the fight between Odysseus (as the beggar) and Irus, a notorious beggar.
 Ctesippus of Same, son of Polytherses. A "ribald fellow" of great wealth who gives Odysseus, disguised as a beggar, a "present" by throwing a heifer's foot at him; Telemachus threatens him in response, and says that he would have killed him if he had not missed. After killing him, the cowherd says that his death is a present in return for the one he gave to Odysseus.
 Demoptolemus, killed by Odysseus.
 Elatus, killed by Eumaeus.
 Euryades, killed by Telemachus.
 Eurydamas. Offered a pair of earrings as a gift to Penelope. Eventually killed by Odysseus.
 Eurymachus, son of Polybus. One of the leaders of the suitors, noted for being smooth and deceitful. He blames everything on Antinous after the latter is killed by Odysseus, saying that the suitors are sorry for what they have done and will repay Odysseus. His pleas do not persuade Odysseus, so he tells the suitors they will have to fight if they wish to live, and he is shot with an arrow while charging Odysseus.
 Eurynomus, son of Aegyptius. His brother Antiphus accompanied Odysseus to the Trojan War and was devoured by Polyphemus on the way back.
 Leiocritus, son of Evenor. Killed by Telemachus.
 Leodes, son of Oenops. The sacrificial priest to the suitors, he hates the evil deeds of the suitors and is indignant with the others. While Odysseus is killing the suitors, he begs for mercy, saying that he tried to stop the others and they were paying for not listening to him. Odysseus hears him out, but says that, as a priest, he must have prayed for Odysseus to not come home, so he kills him anyway.
 Peisander, son of Polyctor. Offered a necklace as a gift to Penelope. Killed by Philoeteus.
 Polybus, son of Polyctor and father of Eurymachus.

Appearing in the Bibliotheca
An extensive list of Penelope's suitors is given in the Bibliotheca. This source does not appear to fully respect the Homeric tradition, as the numbers are different and not all of those named in the Odyssey appear in the Bibliotheca. Due to the text being damaged, some of the names are repeated several times and the lists for Dulichium and Zacynthus actually contain fewer names than the given figures suggest.

57 suitors from Dulichium

 Amphinomus
 Thoas 
 Demoptolemus
 Amphimachus
 Euryalus
 Paralus
 Evenorides
 Clytius
 Agenor
 Eurypylus
 Pylaemenes
 Acamas
 Thersilochus
 Hagius
 Clymenus
 Philodemus
 Meneptolemus
 Damastor
 Bias
 Telmius
 Polyidus
 Astylochus
 Schedius
 Antigonus
 Marpsius
 Iphidamas
 Argius
 Glaucus
 Calydoneus
 Echion
 Lamas
 Andraemon
 Agerochus
 Medon
 Agrius
 Promus
 Ctesius
 Acarnan
 Cycnus
 Pseras
 Hellanicus
 Periphron
 Megasthenes
 Thrasymedes
 Ormenius
 Diopithes
 Mecisteus
 Antimachus
 Ptolemaeus
 Lestorides
 Nicomachus
 Polypoetes
 Ceraus

23 from Same

 Agelaus
 Peisander
 Elatus
 Ctesippus
 Hippodochus
 Eurystratus
 Archemolus
 Ithacus
 Peisenor
 Hyperenor
 Pheroetes
 Antisthenes
 Cerberus
 Perimedes
 Cynnus
 Thriasus
 Eteoneus
 Clytius
 Prothous
 Lycaethus
 Eumelus
 Itanus
 Lyammus

44 from Zacynthus

 Eurylochus
 Laomedes
 Molebus
 Phrenius
 Indius
 Minis
 Leiocritus
 Pronomus
 Nisas
 Daemon
 Archestratus
 Hippomachus
 Euryalus
 Periallus
 Evenorides
 Clytius
 Agenor
 Polybus
 Polydorus
 Thadytius
 Stratius
 Phrenius
 Indius
 Daesenor
 Laomedon
 Laodicus
 Halius
 Magnes
 Oloetrochus
 Barthas
 Theophron
 Nissaeus
 Alcarops
 Periclymenus
 Antenor
 Pellas
 Celtus
 Periphas
 Ormenus
 Polybus
 Andromedes

12 from Ithaca

 Antinous
 Pronous
 Leiodes
 Eurynomus
 Amphimachus
 Amphialus
 Promachus
 Amphimedon
 Aristratus
 Helenus
 Dulicheus
 Ctesippus

Notes

References 
 Apollodorus, The Library with an English Translation by Sir James George Frazer, F.B.A., F.R.S. in 2 Volumes, Cambridge, MA, Harvard University Press; London, William Heinemann Ltd. 1921. ISBN 0-674-99135-4. Online version at the Perseus Digital Library. Greek text available from the same website.
 Homer, The Odyssey with an English Translation by A.T. Murray, Ph.D. in two volumes. Cambridge, MA., Harvard University Press; London, William Heinemann, Ltd. 1919. . Online version at the Perseus Digital Library. Greek text available from the same website.

External links

 
Characters in the Odyssey
Marriage in classical antiquity